Félicité Thösz is the eleventh studio album by French rock band Magma, released on 3 July 2012.

Background
The album was Magma's first studio release in 27 years to contain new material written after the band's reformation in 1996. 

"Félicité Thösz" was written during 2001-02 by Christian Vander, but only played live by the band from 2009. "Les hommes sont venus" was written and performed in 1992 by Les Voix De Magma, and again in 1995 for the band's 25th anniversary, then called "Tous Ensemble".

Félicité Thösz is sung almost entirely in Magma's constructed language Kobaïan, apart from a passage in French named "Seule une fleur est venue au fond des bois en mon cœur (âme)".

Track listing

Personnel
 Christian Vander – drums, vocals, percussion, glockenspiel (11), clavier (11)
 Stella Vander – vocals, percussion, chant (11)
 Isabelle Feuillebois – vocals, chant (11)
 Hervé Aknin – vocals, chant (11)
 Benoit Alziary – vibraphone
 James Mac Gaw – guitar
 Bruno Ruder – piano
 Philippe Bussonnet – bass guitar
 Sandrine Destefanis - chant (11)
 Sylvie Fisichella - chant (11)
 Marcus Linon - chant (11)

References 

Magma (band) albums
2012 albums